Emirates Integrated Telecommunications Company P.J.S.C., commercially rebranded as du in February 2007, is one of the two main telecom operators in the United Arab Emirates. du offers fixed line, mobile telephony, internet and digital television services across the UAE. It also provides carrier services, a data hub, internet exchange facilities and satellite service for broadcasters. It expanded its services in support of economic and social transformation of UAE and operates subsidiaries such as EITC Investment Holdings Limited, Edara (Telco Operations FZ-LLC), Smart Dubai Platform Project Company LLC and EITC Singapore PTE. LTD.

History
du mobile telecommunication services was launched in February 2007 under Emirates Integrated Telecommunications Company (EITC), a public joint stock company incorporated in Dubai through Ministerial Resolution No. 479 of 2005 issued on 28 December 2005. As of 2021, du has 6.7 million (39%) of UAE mobile subscribers and 236,000 fixed line subscribers. Its shares are listed on Dubai Financial Market and is regulated by the Securities & Commodities Authority and the Telecommunications And Digital Government Regulatory Authority (TDRA) of the UAE.

Ownership
EITC's subsidiaries is 50.12% owned by Emirates Investment Authority (EIA), 10.06%% by Mamoura Diversified Global Holding formerly Mubadala Development Company, 19.7% by Emirates Communications & Technology Company LLC (ECT) and 20.12% by public shareholders. It is listed on the Dubai Financial Market (DFM) and trades under the name du.

Services & products
du offers mobile and fixed telephony, broadband connectivity and IPTV services to individuals, homes and businesses. It also provides carrier services for businesses and satellite up/downlink services for TV broadcasters. Subscribers to du mobile services are identified by the dialing prefix 055, 052 and 058. Its tariff plans for private subscribers include Home Plans, Postpaid Plans and Prepaid Plans while it offers corporate subscribers Closed Business User Group free calling, and preferred International Destinations. du's device and application IoT management platform allows users to connect and control devices remotely, monitor conditions and generate advance real-time analytics. du offers a multi-tenant platform with integration capabilities that can be based on the cloud or be on premise, with plug-in suite for AI machine learning, enabling business automation. du hosts Blockchain Platform on 'Dubai Pulse'.

Network

Radio Frequency Summary

LTE 
du first launched LTE in 2012 on the FDD-LTE Band 3 (1800 MHz) frequency, in August 2014 it was then announced that du had installed and successfully tested VoLTE over its network. In July 2014, du launched Cat. 6 LTE-Advanced with carrier aggregation and 4x4 MIMO combining 20 MHz of Band 3 (1800 MHz) and 15 MHz of Band 20 (800 MHz).

5G 
du began its 5G network infrastructure development in 2015 and launched in 2019 becoming the first telco operator to roll out 5G network in UAE and the first to provide Preregistered customers with 5G-enabled devices in the middle east and demonstrated video over 5G call using its Non-standalone (NSA) network, IMS Core and 5G smartphones. In 2020, du deployed the Middle East and North Africa's first millimeter Wave at Yas Island, Abu Dhabi providing the highest ultra-high mobile broadband 5G services in the region. The mm Wave frequencies improved its network capacity allowing users access to improved services in high-traffic areas. In 2021, du deployed the first 5G leased line with ultra-low latency in the UAE.

VoLTE 
In 2020, EITC increased its fiber footprint, launched VoLTE services, delivered a 100G backbone upgrade, equipped two data centres with advanced Network Functions Virtualisation Infrastructure (NFVI), and deployed the Telco Cloud NFVI at two DC.

Corporate governance

Corporate Governance
The corporate governance framework of EITC is in accordance with laws and regulations prescribed by the Securities and Commodities Authority of the UAE (SCA) including the Chairman of SCA's Board of Directors' Decision No. 3 of 2020 concerning approval of joint stock companies' governance guide (SCA Corporate Governance Rules). EITC complies with all the governing laws as well as the applicable regulations and policy directives issued by the SCA and the Dubai Financial Market (DFM). In the wake of COVID-19 outbreak in 2020, EITC's Board of Directors monitored the measures taken by the management to ensure minimal disruptions and impact on the business of EITC.

Emiratisation 
du supports Emiratisation policy of the government of UAE by creating jobs, offering learning opportunities, and encouraging growth and development for UAE Nationals. As of 2021, du's total workforce comprises 585 or 37.8% Emiratis with women constituting 52%. In leadership positions, Emiratis occupy 45% with women occupying 17% departmental leadership positions.

Masar, du's Graduate Trainee Programme empowers emerging Emirati talents and supports their career growth to become full-fledged professionals. In its other programme, Career Framework & Succession Planning, du identifies potential UAE nationals who go through an extensive leadership and succession development program to prepare them for future leadership roles within the organization. For its Emiratization strategy, du has won the MOHRE Emiratization Award for two consecutive years (2018 & 2019) and won the GCC Best Nationalization Initiatives in 2019.

Sustainability 
du core business and social responsibility objectives are to deliver the benefits of ICT to everyone, operating as a responsible corporate citizen, and making its people and communities happier. In 2020, du empowered families, schools, universities, and businesses in the UAE by enabling everyone to be connected anytime, and anywhere. du is the official strategic partner of the Smart Dubai Office and the platform provider for Dubai Pulse. The company is also a member of the Dubai Chamber of Commerce and Industry's Chamber for Responsible Business.

Senior management
From 2006 to 2019, Osman Sultan served as the chief executive officer (CEO). In June 2021, Fahad Al Hassawi, EITC's former acting CEO, was entrusted by the EITC board to steer the organization's transformation agenda in the capacity of CEO. Prior to 2019 the Executive Vice President of Brand and Communications was Hala Badri, who oversaw innovative use of Twitter as part of du's complaints procedures.

Criticism
The UAE telecom market is highly restricted, with both major players being largely government owned. There is little real competition, with the choice of provider generally determined by geographic location. du typically has a monopoly on freezones, while Etisalat has a monopoly in other specific areas.

Censorship
Following the internet guidelines of the Telecommunications Regulatory Authority of the UAE, du is required to block internet content based on the prohibited content categories list provided by the TRA,  the list includes pornography, drugs, intellectual property infringement, discrimination, racism, blasphemy and other categories that doesn't comply with the internet guidelines of the country.

DNS resolvers
DNS server 1: 94.200.200.200
DNS server 2: 91.74.74.74

See also
Etisalat
Telecommunications in the United Arab Emirates

References

Companies based in Dubai
Internet service providers of the United Arab Emirates
Mobile phone companies of the United Arab Emirates
Companies listed on the Dubai Financial Market